HMS Africa was a 64-gun third-rate ship of the line of the Royal Navy, launched by William Barnard at Barnard's Thames Yard in Deptford on 11 April 1781.

Construction and design
Africa was a 64-gun third-rate Inflexible-class ship of the line designed by John Williams. Her class was a smaller version of the 74-gun ship of the line HMS Albion designed by Sir Thomas Slade which in turn was influenced by the 1719 Establishment design of the 90-gun ship of the line HMS Neptune.

Africa was ordered on 11 February 1778 to be built at Deptford Dockyard by Adams and Barnard and approved for construction on 29 February. She measured 1,414 tons burthen. The fitting out process for Africa was completed at the Deptford and Woolwich dockyards in July.

The lead ship of Africas class, HMS Inflexible, was launched in 1780 and opinions of her sailing qualities were so low that it was decided that no more ships of the design would be built after 1780. The next planned ship of the class, HMS Diadem, was instead built to the Intrepid-class design, and Africa and her sister ships were only completed to the deprecated design because by the time of Inflexibles trials they had already been laid down.

Service

American Revolutionary War
Africa was commissioned by Captain Thomas Newnham in March 1781. In January of the following year command of the ship changed to Captain Robert McDowell and under him she sailed to the East Indies in the squadron of Commodore Sir Richard Bickerton on 6 February 1782. As such Africa fought in the unsuccessful Battle of Cuddalore on 20 June 1783. With the American Revolutionary War having ended in September she returned home to Britain where she was paid off in May 1784. The ship was then put in ordinary at Plymouth Dockyard in June. Africa was briefly commissioned for one month by Captain James Kempthorne in November 1790 but this was her only service until the beginning of the French Revolutionary Wars in 1792.

French Revolutionary Wars
The ship was recommissioned for this war under Captain Roddam Home in November 1793, under whom she sailed to Nova Scotia on 18 May 1794. Having transferred to the Jamaica Station she then participated in an attack on Leogane, Haiti, on 21 March 1796 where, after Africa and the ship of the line HMS Leviathan had been heavily damaged by shore batteries, the landings were called off. In October of the same year Africa was again paid off, spending almost two years out of service before she was recommissioned as a hospital ship under Lieutenant John Bryant in September 1798. Command of the ship changed to Lieutenant John Dixon in early 1800 but little else of note occurred in her service as a hospital ship.

Napoleonic Wars

The Napoleonic Wars having begun, Africa was reconfigured as a 64-gun ship of the line again by Thomas Pitcher at Northfleet between September 1804 and July 1805. She was recommissioned by Captain Henry Digby at the end of her conversion. Africa was present at the Battle of Trafalgar on 21 October 1805; having been separated from the main British fleet before the battle, she arrived from a different direction without knowing the battle plan that Admiral Horatio Nelson had devised. As the rest of the fleet engaged the combined Franco-Spanish fleet in a pell-mell battle, Digby sailed Africa down the line of enemy ships in a parallel fashion, exchanging broadsides. She lost eighteen men killed and a further forty-four wounded in the battle.

Gunboat War
During the Gunboat War, Africa was under the command of Captain John Barrett. On 15 October 1808, Africa was escorting a convoy of 137 merchant ships in the Baltic, with the assistance of the bomb vessel HMS Thunder and two gun-brigs. They left Karlskrona that day and on 20 October they anchored in the Øresund off Malmö. At noon a flotilla of Danish gunboats was seen moving towards the convoy and Africa sailed to intercept them.
The flotilla consisted of 25 gunboats and seven armed launches, mounting some 70 heavy cannons and with an overall total of some 1600 men. It was under the command of Commodore Johan Cornelius Krieger.

At 1:30 the wind died and Africa was immobilized. By 2:50pm the gunboats had stationed themselves off Africas quarters, where few of her guns could fire, and opened fire. The battle continued until 6:45pm when with night closing in all firing ceased. Had daylight lasted another hour the Danes might have captured Africa, however nightfall meant both forces left the battlefield without victory for either side. As it was, she had lost 9 men killed and 51 wounded, including  Barrett. She was so badly battered that she had to return to Karlskrona for repairs. The convoy, however, managed to reach  Britain.

In 1810 George Frederick Ryves commanded Africa, in the Baltic, from which he brought home a large convoy, notwithstanding the severity of the weather and the violence of the gales.

John Houlton Marshall promoted to commander on the ship at a ceremony held on 21 October 1810 to commemorate the Battle of Trafalgar.

War of 1812

Under the command of Captain John Bastard, Africa was part of Sir Philip Broke's squadron that pursued but ultimately failed to catch  early in the War of 1812.

Fate
Africa was broken up in May 1814 at Portsmouth.

Notes and citations

Notes

Citations

References

 Allen, Joseph (1852). Battles of the British Navy. London: Henry G. Bohn.
 
 Lavery, Brian (1983). The Ship of the Line - Volume 1: The development of the battlefleet 1650-1850. London: Conway Maritime Press. .

External links
 

Ships of the line of the Royal Navy
Inflexible-class ships of the line
War of 1812 ships of the United Kingdom
Ships built in Deptford
1781 ships